Fernando Spinelli is an Italian Argentine footballer who plays for Italian Eccellenza club S.C. Palazzolo. He played for a number of Italian Serie C clubs in the 2000s and 2010s.

Club career

Early career
Spinelli played for Chievo's youth team in 2000–01 Campionato Nazionale Primavera season.

Spinelli joined Malaysian club Pahang in December 2003.

Italian clubs
Spinelli went back to Italy and joined Eccellenza Calabria club Paolana in 2004–05 season.

He then left for Ragusa after released by Paolana.

From 2006 to 2008 he played for Andria.

In July 2008 Spinelli and Emanuele Catania were signed by another club Cosenza. In January 2009 Spinelli left for Taranto.

Spinelli was signed by Cavese in December 2009. He made his debut for that club in league in January 2010.

At the start of 2010–11 Lega Pro Prima Divisione season, he joined U.S. Siracusa. The first team of that club folded in 2012.

In the same transfer window, Spinelli joined Trapani. The club won a promotion to Serie B in 2013.

Spinelli was assigned number 5 shirt at the start of 2013–14 Serie B season.

After half a season without any league appearance, Spinelli joined Pavia in January 2014, along with Trapani new signing Marcello Mancosu, which Trapani decided to loan out the player.

In mid-2014, he joined Viterbese Castrense.

Spinelli joined Lega Pro club AlbinoLeffe in January 2015.

In August 2015, Spinelli return to the city of Syracuse for A.S.D. Città di Siracusa, an illegitimate phoenix club of 2012 folded U.S. Siracusa. The club was relocated from Palazzolo Acreide to Syracuse in 2013 and then renamed. The club won the Group I of 2015–16 Serie D season. The club also renamed to Siracusa Calcio circa 2016.

Spinelli remained in Syracuse for 2016–17 Lega Pro season. He signed a new contract in June 2017.

In 2018 Spinelli left for Eccellenza Sicily club S.C. Palazzolo, an illegitimate phoenix club of the 2013 relocated A.C. Palazzolo. It was reported that he was released in September 2019, however, he returned to the squad in the same season.

References

External links

 AIC profile (data by football.it) 
 
 

Argentine footballers
Sri Pahang FC players
S.S. Fidelis Andria 1928 players
Cosenza Calcio players
Taranto F.C. 1927 players
Cavese 1919 players
U.S. Siracusa players
Trapani Calcio players
F.C. Pavia players
U.S. Viterbese 1908 players
Siracusa Calcio players
A.S.D. S.C. Palazzolo players
Serie C players
Serie D players
Association football midfielders
Argentine expatriate footballers
Expatriate footballers in Malaysia
Expatriate footballers in Italy
Argentine expatriate sportspeople in Malaysia
Argentine expatriate sportspeople in Italy
Footballers from Buenos Aires
1982 births
Living people